The Rubyiro River is a river in southwestern Rwanda that is a left-hand tributary of the Ruzizi River.  

References
Citations

Sources

Rivers of Rwanda